Philip "Flippie" Rudolph van der Merwe (born 8 July 1957 in Dibeng, Northern Cape Province) is a South African former rugby union player who played six test matches for the South Africa national rugby union team from 1981 to 1989.

Playing career
Van der Merwe made his provincial debut for WP in 1977 while a student at Stellenbosch University. He was selected on the replacement bench for the Springboks in the first tests against the touring British Lions in 1980. Van der Merwe made his test debut in 1981 against New Zealand on 29 August 1981 at Athletic Park in Wellington. He played his last test match for the Springboks, eight years later, against the World XV at Newlands. Van der Merwe also played in six tour matches for the Springboks.

In 1986, van der Merwe was selected to represent the Overseas Unions XV against the Five Nations XV in a match played at Twickenham Stadium to commemorate the centenary of the International Rugby Football Board.

Test history

Personal
Van der Merwe is the father of François van der Merwe, a professional rugby player and Flip van der Merwe, also a former professional rugby player and Springbok.

See also
List of South Africa national rugby union players – Springbok no. 526

References

1957 births
South African rugby union players
Living people
South Africa international rugby union players
Western Province (rugby union) players
Cheetahs (rugby union) players
Leopards (rugby union) players
Griquas (rugby union) players
SWD Eagles players
Rugby union props
Rugby union players from the Northern Cape